Stephen Robert Eaton, OAM (born 15 September 1975) is an Australian athlete with cerebral palsy from Toowoomba, Queensland who competes at the national and international level in discus throwing and shot put at events such as the Paralympic Games and IPC Athletics World Championships.

Eaton first began to participate in track and field events at the age of eight, under the guidance of coach Anne Marsh. He represented Australia at a Paralympic level for the first time in 1993, and won two gold medals at the 1994 FESPIC Games. He won a bronze medal in the Men's Discus F32–33 event at the 1996 Atlanta Paralympics.  He won a silver medal in the men's discus at the 1998 IPC Athletics World Championships. He had an Australian Institute of Sport Athletics with a Disability scholarship from 1997 to 2000. He was also supported by the Queensland Academy of Sport.

He won a gold medal at the 2000 Summer Paralympics in the men's discus F34 event, for which he received a Medal of the Order of Australia. In 2000, he received an Australian Sports Medal.

Eaton has highlighted the therapeutic value of sport for anyone with a disability. He commented "If I didn't play sport I don't know what I would do. I get to meet people and to travel."

References

External links
Stephen Eaton – Athletics Australia Results

1975 births
Living people
Athletes (track and field) at the 1996 Summer Paralympics
Athletes (track and field) at the 2000 Summer Paralympics
Australian Institute of Sport Paralympic track and field athletes
Australian male discus throwers
Australian male shot putters
Cerebral Palsy category Paralympic competitors
FESPIC Games competitors
Medalists at the 1996 Summer Paralympics
Medalists at the 2000 Summer Paralympics
Paralympic athletes of Australia
Paralympic bronze medalists for Australia
Paralympic gold medalists for Australia
Paralympic medalists in athletics (track and field)
Recipients of the Australian Sports Medal
Recipients of the Medal of the Order of Australia
Sportspeople from Toowoomba
Track and field athletes with cerebral palsy